Branchinella is a genus of crustaceans in the family Thamnocephalidae. This fairy shrimp genus is found across many parts of the world, but especially western Australia and southern Africa.

Several species have small ranges and are threatened by habitat destruction. For example, B. latzi is only known from south Northern Territory and southwest Queensland, but it has been extirpated from the Uluru region due to pollution from urine and faeces of tourists.

Selected species
Branchinella includes the following species:

 Branchinella acacioidea Belk & Sissom, 1992
 Branchinella affinis Linder, 1941
 Branchinella alachua Dexter, 1953
 Branchinella apophysata Linder, 1941
 Branchinella arborea Geddes, 1981
 Branchinella australiensis (Richters, 1876)
 Branchinella basispina Geddes, 1981
 Branchinella buchananensis Geddes, 1981
 Branchinella chudeaui (Daday, 1910)
 Branchinella compacta Linder, 1941
 Branchinella complexidigitata Timms, 2003
 Branchinella denticulata Linder, 1941
 Branchinella dubia (Schwartz, 1917)
 Branchinella frondosa Henry, 1924
 Branchinella halsei Timms, 2003
 Branchinella hardingi (Qadri & Baqai, 1956)
 Branchinella hattahensis Geddes, 1981
 Branchinella kadjikadji Timms, 2003
 Branchinella kugenumaensis (Ishikawa, 1895)
 Branchinella latzi Geddes, 1981
 Branchinella lithaca (Creaser, 1940)
 Branchinella longirostris Wolf, 1911
 Branchinella lyrifera Linder, 1941
 Branchinella madurai Raj, 1951
 Branchinella mcraeae Timms, 2005
 Branchinella minuta Rœn, 1952
 Branchinella multidigitata Timms, 2008
 Branchinella nana Timms, 2003
 Branchinella nichollsi Linder, 1941
 Branchinella occidentalis Dakin, 1914
 Branchinella ondonguae (Barnard, 1924)
 Branchinella ornata Daday, 1910
 Branchinella papillata Timms, 2008
 Branchinella pinderi Timms, 2008
 Branchinella pinnata Geddes, 1981
 Branchinella proboscida Henry, 1924
 Branchinella simplex Linder, 1941
 Branchinella spinosa (Milne-Edwards, 1840)
 Branchinella sublettei Sissom, 1976
 Branchinella thailandensis Sanoamuang, Saengphan & Murugan, 2002
 Branchinella vosperi Timms, 2008
 Branchinella wellardi Milner, 1929

Some related fairy shrimp, such as Phallocryptus wrighti, were formerly placed in Branchinella.

References

Anostraca
Branchiopoda genera
Taxonomy articles created by Polbot